Stephen Friedman (born December 21, 1937) is the former chairman of the US President's Intelligence Advisory Board. He was nominated on October 27, 2005, to replace Brent Scowcroft in the position.

Early life and education
Friedman was born in New York City, to a Jewish family. He received his BA from Cornell University in 1959 and his law degree from Columbia University Law School in 1962. At Cornell he was a wrestler and a member of the Quill and Dagger society.  At Columbia he was on the Law Review.

Career

In 1966 Friedman joined Goldman Sachs and became a partner in 1973. From 1987 until November 1990 he was the co-chief operating officer and either co-chairman or chairman between 1990 and 1994.  Friedman re-joined the board of Goldman in April 2005, and stepped down from serving on the board on May 22, 2013.

In 1998 Friedman joined Stone Point Capital LLC. He also served as Senior Advisor at Crestview Partners, LP and a Special Limited Partner and Member of the Executive Advisory Board of Insight Partners.

From 1998 to 2002, he served as a senior principal of Marsh & McLennan Capital Corp. In March 1999 President Clinton announced his intention to appoint Friedman and Crescencio S. Arcos to serve as Members of the President's Intelligence Advisory Board.

From December 2002 to December 2004 Friedman was United States Assistant to President George W. Bush for Economic Policy as well as the director of the National Economic Council. On October 27, 2005 Friedman was asked to replace Brent Scowcroft as the Chairman of the President’s Foreign Intelligence Advisory Board.

Chairman of New York Federal Reserve Bank
Friedman was the Chairman of the New York Federal Reserve Bank, a body which implements the Wall Street policies of the Federal Reserve, during a period of immense financial market upheaval, from January 2008 until May 7, 2009.  When Goldman Sachs was converted to a bank holding company in September 2008 the bank then came under the regulatory authority of the New York Fed, which made Friedman’s position as a member of Goldman Sachs’ board a violation of Federal Reserve policy. At the time of the conversion Friedman requested a waiver from this violation, which was granted about 10 weeks later.

On May 7, 2009, Friedman resigned as Chairman of the Federal Reserve Bank of New York.  In his letter of resignation Friedman explains why: ‘Last Fall, after Goldman Sachs Group, Inc. became a bank holding company, I agreed to remain on the Board, pursuant to the waiver authority of the Board of Governors of the Federal Reserve System, to provide continuity during a time of financial market instability. Today, although I have been in compliance with the rules, my public service motivated continuation on the Reserve Bank Board is being mis-characterized as improper. The Federal Reserve System has important work to do and does not need this distraction.’

Friedman was criticized for seemingly benefiting from his role as Chair of the New York Fed branch due to the federal government's aid to Goldman Sachs in recent months. He had "remain[ed] on the board of Goldman even as he was supposedly regulating [Goldman]; in order to rectify the problem, he applied for, and got, a conflict of interest waiver from the government. Friedman was also supposed to divest himself of his Goldman stock after Goldman became a bankholding company, but thanks to the waiver, he was allowed to go out and buy 52,000 additional shares in his old bank, leaving him $3 million richer," as one report put it. Friedman's resignation announcement came within an hour of the government's release of the 2009 stress tests for 19 U.S. financial institutions.

Public service

Friedman is involved in several public service activities, including Chairman Emeritus of the Board of Columbia University, Chairman Emeritus of the Executive Committee of the Brookings Institution, and a member of the Council on Foreign Relations. He is also a benefactor of his alma mater Cornell University, particularly its wrestling program as the college's wrestling building is known as the Friedman Center.

Personal life
Stephen Friedman is married to Barbara Benioff, chairwoman of the board of governors of Hebrew Union College. The couple live on Fifth Avenue in Manhattan, and have three children: two daughters, Susan and Caroline, and a son, David Benioff. Benioff, who goes by his mother's maiden name, is a writer, screenwriter and adaptor of Game of Thrones. David is married to actress Amanda Peet.

References

External links

|-

|-

|-

|-

1937 births
American chief operating officers
American financial businesspeople
American investment bankers
American people of German-Jewish descent
Chairmen of Goldman Sachs
Chief Executive Officers of Goldman Sachs
Columbia Law School alumni
Cornell University alumni
Federal Reserve Bank people
Living people
Politicians from New York City
United States presidential advisors